Kedgaon is a village in the Karmala taluka of Solapur district in Maharashtra state, India.

Demographics
Covering  and comprising 585 households at the time of the 2011 census of India, Kedgaon had a population of 2690. There were 1462 males and 1228 females, with 304 people being aged six or younger.

References

Villages in Karmala taluka